Yoo Dae-hyun (born 28 February 1990) is a South Korean footballer who plays as full back for Bucheon FC in K League Challenge.

Career
Yoo joined Tochigi SC in 2012 but left the team two years later. He made only 8 appearances in J2 League.

He was selected by Bucheon FC 1995 in the 2014 K League draft.

Club statistics

References

External links

1990 births
Living people
South Korean footballers
South Korean expatriate footballers
J2 League players
Japan Football League players
K League 2 players
Tochigi SC players
FC Machida Zelvia players
Bucheon FC 1995 players
Expatriate footballers in Japan
South Korean expatriate sportspeople in Japan
Association football defenders